Bir Dheb is a town and commune in Tébessa Province, Algeria.

References

Communes of Tébessa Province